Roberto de Sousa Rezende (born 18 January 1985) is a Brazilian professional footballer who plays for Rio Branco Esporte Clube as a defensive midfielder.

Club career
Born in Goiânia, Goiás, Sousa made his professional debuts with São Paulo-based Guarani Futebol Clube. He played 34 games in his second year, but his team suffered relegation from Série A.

Sousa moved to Europe in 2005, joining Celta de Vigo in Spain. He never imposed himself with the Galicians, also being loaned several times for the duration of his contract, mainly in the country's second division; his La Liga debut came on 20 November 2005, as he played 18 minutes in a 2–1 home win against Atlético Madrid.

After a third and final loan, with Leixões S.C. in Portugal, Sousa was released by Celta but remained in the country of his last club, joining C.S. Marítimo. On 2 December 2011 he scored one of only three official goals in his spell in the island of Madeira, helping to a 2–1 home success over S.L. Benfica for the season's Portuguese Cup.

On 30 June 2012, Sousa moved teams and countries again, signing for Persepolis F.C. in Iran. He was released the following month, however.

International career
Sousa featured in six games for Brazil at the 2005 FIFA U-20 World Cup, helping the national side finish third in the Netherlands.

References

External links

1985 births
Living people
Sportspeople from Goiânia
Brazilian footballers
Association football midfielders
Campeonato Brasileiro Série A players
Campeonato Brasileiro Série B players
Guarani FC players
Rio Branco Esporte Clube players
La Liga players
Segunda División players
RC Celta de Vigo players
UD Salamanca players
Racing de Ferrol footballers
Primeira Liga players
Liga Portugal 2 players
Leixões S.C. players
C.S. Marítimo players
Persepolis F.C. players
Brazil youth international footballers
Brazil under-20 international footballers
Brazilian expatriate footballers
Expatriate footballers in Spain
Expatriate footballers in Portugal
Expatriate footballers in Iran
Brazilian expatriate sportspeople in Spain
Brazilian expatriate sportspeople in Portugal